Minor Victories are a British alternative rock supergroup formed in 2015.  The band members are vocalist Rachel Goswell (Slowdive), guitarists Stuart Braithwaite (Mogwai) and Justin Lockey (Editors), and film-maker James Lockey of Hand Held Cine Club.

Formation
Rachel Goswell and Justin Lockey had previously made music together. It was through Goswell that Braithwaite and the Lockey brothers met.

The band was unveiled on social media in July 2015 with the announcement of a forthcoming album, including collaborations with other artists including Mark Kozelek of Sun Kil Moon and James Graham of The Twilight Sad. However, Minor Victories was initially a casual idea of two artists collaborating together, which later turned into a supergroup. In an interview by the OffBeat Music (OBM) magazine, Stuart Braithwaite said about the formation of the Supergroup:As the project went on it got better and better until it was finished. Considering how it all was at the start, it seems incredible. Definitely, I was quite surprised.A few days later a "teaser trailer" named Film One was released featuring short clips of forthcoming songs. In a September 2015 interview with website exclaim.ca, Braithwaite said that the band was working with producer Tony Doogan, that the album was "80% recorded", and that it would be released in early 2016.  Asked about how the album would sound, he said "To be honest, I think if you know the music that all of us have made, it won't really surprise you. It has a lot of the good elements from everyone's bands.".

Band members
Rachel Goswell - vocals, guitar
Stuart Braithwaite – guitar, backing vocals
Justin Lockey – guitar, electronics, keyboards
James Lockey - bass

Discography
 Minor Victories (2016), Fat Possum Records
 Orchestral Variations (2016), Play It Again Sam

Critical response 

Minor Victories received critical acclaim from musical critics. On Metacritic, their first album holds an average critics score of 75, based on 17 critics, indicating "Generally favorable reviews". Duncan Harman of The Skinny Magazine said, "Minor Victories is frequently beautiful, and it’s the subtle application of the abrasive (on tracks such as Out To Sea) where this project really comes into its own; a few listens in, and captivation becomes its own reward."

Heather Phares of All Music wrote, "While Minor Victories builds on its members' legacies, the band sounds more excited about the present and the future than looking back." Craig Jones of DIY Magazine wrote, "At no point of this record are you left hoping for another Editors anthem or new Slowdive music--yes that would be wonderful, but we now have Minor Victories to savor. Hopefully they’re here to stay."

Steve Klinge of Magnet Magazine gave the album an "Essential New Music" designation saying, "Minor Victories is a bit like Great Britain’s version of Broken Social Scene with its collaboration among equals and its penchant for glorious, cathartic climaxes."

However, Pitchfork's Evan Rytlewski criticized this album saying, "What’s missing, though, is the central promise of a supergroup: the thrill of hearing established musicians in a truly different context. Minor Victories’ lineup may stem from different circles, but their approaches are so complementary that there's rarely any tension or surprise."

References

External links
"Film One" at Hand Held Cine Club
Minor Victories at Fatpossam

British alternative rock groups
British noise rock groups
Rock music supergroups
British art rock groups
Dream pop musical groups
Musical groups established in 2015
2015 establishments in the United Kingdom
PIAS Recordings artists
Fat Possum Records artists